Pine Level, Alabama may refer to :

Pine Level, Autauga County, Alabama
Pine Level, Coffee County, Alabama
Pine Level, Montgomery County, Alabama